Saint-Léon may refer to the following:

Places
France
 Saint-Léon, Allier, a commune in the department of Allier
 Saint-Léon, Haute-Garonne, a commune in the department of Haute-Garonne
 Saint-Léon, Gironde, a commune in the department of Gironde
 Saint-Léon, Lot-et-Garonne, a commune in the department of Lot-et-Garonne
 Saint-Léon-d'Issigeac, a commune in the department of Dordogne
 Saint-Léon-sur-l'Isle, a commune in the department of Dordogne
 Saint-Léon-sur-Vézère, a commune in the department of Dordogne
 Saint-Léon, a hamlet, part of the commune of Merléac, Côtes-d'Armor

Quebec, Canada
 Saint-Léon-le-Grand, Bas-Saint-Laurent, Quebec, a municipality in the Bas-Saint-Laurent region
 Saint-Léon-le-Grand, Mauricie, Quebec, a municipality in the Mauricie region
 Saint-Léon-de-Standon, Quebec, a municipality in the Chaudière-Appalaches region

People
 Arthur Saint-Leon, (1821-1870) ballet choreographer

See also
St. Leon (disambiguation)